The 1932–33 IHL season was the fourth season of the International Hockey League, a minor professional ice hockey league in the Midwestern and Eastern United States and Canada. Six teams participated in the league, and the Buffalo Bisons won the championship.

Regular season

Playoffs

External links
Season on hockeydb.com

1932 in ice hockey
1933 in ice hockey